Luchino Visconti is a 1999 Italian  documentary film about the filmmaker Luchino Visconti and directed by Carlo Lizzani. It stars Claudia Cardinale.

References

External links
 
 

1999 films
1990s Italian-language films
Italian documentary films
Documentary films about film directors and producers
1990s Italian films